Silja Dögg Gunnarsdóttir (born 16 December 1973) is an Icelandic politician who is a member of the Althing (Iceland's parliament) for the South Constituency since 2013 and has also served as Chairman of the Icelandic Delegation to the Nordic Council since 2017.

At the end of October 2019, Silja Dögg was elected to the position of president of the Nordic Council for the year 2020.''

References

External links 

 Biography of Silja Dögg Gunnarsdóttir on the parliament website (Icelandic)

Living people
1973 births
Silja Dögg Gunnarsdóttir
21st-century Icelandic politicians
Silja Dögg Gunnarsdóttir
Silja Dögg Gunnarsdóttir
Silja Dögg Gunnarsdóttir